Otto Ebel von Sosen (26 March 1899 – 6 February 1974) was a German musician, conductor and composer.

Life 

Born in Rendsburg, Sosen studied at the University of Music and Performing Arts Munich. On 16 December of the same year, and from there he was already active as conductor and as the first director of the institution. As such, Sosen began to build up a Radio orchestra with initially only three, in 1927 already with 17 musicians. In the following year 1928, he founded and directed, at first under the name "Niedersächsisches Landesorchester", the later Niedersächsisches Symphonie-Orchester. Still at the time of the Weimar Republic, he had the orchestra from 1931 to broadcast over the radio on Mondays for more than a decade, initially from the  Leineschloss.

After the Machtergreifung by the Nazis in 1933, personnel and structural changes were made at the Hanoverian broadcasting station, new station manager was now Harry Moss. With the beginning of the Second World War from September 1939 on, the own productions of the Hanoverian Norag subsidiary station were forbidden, but the Monday Castle Concerts Sosen were excluded from this,  which were last broadcast from the Konzerthaus am , until these too had to be discontinued after the Bombing of Hanover in 1943. 

Sosen, who wrote and composed numerous orchestral pieces, choral works, chamber music and songs, organized the Bad Pyrmont Concerts from 1955 to 1964 during the years of the Wirtschaftswunder of the Federal Republic of Germany.

Sosen died in Bad Pyrmont aged 74.

Work

Composition 
 Arioso im alten Stil für Klarinette und Streichorchester. Opus 15 (Collection Litolff, Nr. 5501 : 1.50) (reprint, for clarinet in A with piano; head part also in English and French), Leipzig: Edition Peters; Leipzig: Litolff, 1958
 Deutsches Interludium. Opus 7, Leipzig, London, New York: Edition Peters Group
 Abendlied. Für Salonorchester, Leipzig, London, New York: Edition Peters Group

Publications 
 Pyrmont. Kleines Brevier eines Weltbades. Holzminden: Weserlandverlag, 1953
 Femmes compositeurs de musique. Dictionnaire biographique. Paris, Rosier 1910 (?)

See also 
 Gottbegnadeten list.

Further reading 
 Friedrich Kranich, Käte Steinitz, Kurt Schwitters: Mit Hilfe der Technik, Texts on Walter Lehnhoff, Walter Gieseking and Otto Ebel von Sosen, Berlin: A. Fürstner, 1928

Notes

References

External links 
 

German conductors (music)
German composers
20th-century German non-fiction writers
1899 births
1974 deaths
 People from Rendsburg